Renerich Marl Ocon Jovenier (born May 15, 2004), better known by her stage name Barbara Miguel, is a Filipino actress who won the Best Actress in the 2013 Harlem International Film Festival for the film Nuwebe.

Filmography

Television

Film

Awards and nominations

References

External links
 

Living people
Filipino film actresses
Filipino television actresses
Filipino child actresses
2004 births
GMA Network personalities
Tagalog people